Ian Leslie Redford (born 6 April 1951 in Carshalton, Surrey) is an English actor who has featured on stage, in film and on television in various roles.

These include leads in several series A Raging Calm by Stan Barstow, The House of Eliott, September Song, The Men's Room, Rooms, County Hall, Medics and Moon and Son as well as guesting in Thriller, Peak Practice, Foyle's War, Casualty, Crown Prosecutor, Spender, Wycliffe, Lovejoy, Doctors, The Broker's Man, One Foot in the Grave, Van der Valk, Midsomer Murders, Dramarama, Under the Hammer, William and Mary, Empire, Heartbeat, The Chase, New Tricks, Minder, Boon, The Bill, Bergerac, Shelley and Hannay. Redford's roles include Keith Appleyard in Coronation Street during 2005 and 2006. During 1990–91 he played the role of Ken Raynor in BBC's EastEnders.

Career 
Redford was a member of the National Youth Theatre and appeared with them in the 1967 production of Zigger Zagger. He has appeared widely in English theatre productions and on television and film. He played the main role of Alfieri in Arthur Miller's A View from the Bridge at the Royal Exchange, Manchester. His film career includes the 1981 BBC TV play Artemis 81; Spaghetti House (1982), The Great Escape II: The Untold Story (1988), Getting It Right (1989), Three Men and a Little Lady (1990), Just Like a Woman (1992), The Remains of the Day (1993), I.D. (1995), and  The Prince and the Pauper (2000). He also starred in Bread or Blood for the BBC, based on William Henry Hudson's The Shepherd's Life. For Channel 4 he was the Henry VIII in Henry VIII: The Mind of a Tyrant.

He received a best actor nomination in the Manchester Evening News awards in 2010 for his role as Creon in Antigone at the Manchester Royal Exchange. He was part of Max Stafford-Clark's regular company of actors for Out of Joint Theatre Company appearing in 11 productions over 20 years ; he received praise for his work in Stafford-Clark's touring production of Timberlake Wertenbaker's Our Country's Good. He also appeared on stage in David Hare's The Permanent Way.

Redford co-wrote A Dish of Tea With Doctor Johnson with Max Stafford-Clark and Russell Barr and starred as Samuel Johnson in London and Edinburgh, opposite Barr as Boswell. The Guardian rated the production 4/5, saying "the two actors precisely convey ... the constantly shifting nature of the relationship" between the men and concluding "this is a rare treat in which the performers seem to own the material". The Independent praised his performance, "mercurial and greedy".

Selected theatre 
 Creon in Antigone by Sophocles. Directed by Greg Hersov at the Royal Exchange, Manchester (2008)
 Mephistopheles in Doctor Faustus by Christopher Marlowe. Directed by Toby Trow at the Royal Exchange, Manchester (2010)
 Alfieri in A View From The Bridge by Arthur Miller. Directed by Sarah Frankcom at the Royal Exchange, Manchester (2011)
 Mike in The Gatekeeper by Chloe Moss. Directed by Tessa Walker at the Royal Exchange, Manchester (2012)
Amos/ Albus Dumbledore in Harry Potter and the Cursed Child by Jack Thorne. Directed by John Tiffany at the Palace Theatre, London (2021)

Personal life 
Redford is married, has three children and lives in London. He attended Rutlish School 1962–69, where he took a leading role in many school amateur dramatic productions.

Filmography

References

External links 

Ian Redford credits

1951 births
Living people
English male soap opera actors
English male stage actors
English male film actors
Male actors from London
People from Carshalton
20th-century English male actors
21st-century English male actors
People educated at Rutlish School